Freda is a 2021 Haitian drama film directed by Gessica Généus. In June 2021, the film was selected to compete in the Un Certain Regard section at the 2021 Cannes Film Festival. It was selected as the Haitian entry for the Best International Feature Film at the 94th Academy Awards.

See also
 List of submissions to the 94th Academy Awards for Best International Feature Film
 List of Haitian submissions for the Academy Award for Best International Feature Film

References

External links
 

2021 films
2021 drama films
Haitian drama films
Haitian Creole-language films